Geoffrey Martin (7 March 1896 – 7 March 1968) was an Australian cricketer. He played 23 first-class matches for Tasmania between 1921 and 1933.

See also
 List of Tasmanian representative cricketers

References

External links
 

1896 births
1968 deaths
Australian cricketers
Tasmania cricketers
Cricketers from Launceston, Tasmania